Multiple cutaneous leiomyomas, also known as Pilar leiomyomas, arise from the arrectores pilorum muscles, and are made up of a poorly circumscribed proliferation of haphazardly arranged smooth muscle fibers located in the dermis that appear to infiltrate the surrounding tissue and may extend into the subcutis.

Sometimes associated with uterine leiomyomas (a combination known as multiple cutaneous and uterine leiomyomatosis, MCUL), these lesions may also be a manifestation of the hereditary leiomyomatosis and renal cell cancer syndrome.

See also 
 List of cutaneous conditions

References

External links 

Dermal and subcutaneous growths